Richard Junior Turner is a former nose tackle in the National Football League (NFL). He was drafted by the Green Bay Packers in the fourth round of the 1981 NFL Draft and played three seasons with the team.

References

1959 births
Living people
People from Hugo, Oklahoma
Green Bay Packers players
American football defensive tackles
Oklahoma Sooners football players
Edmond Memorial High School alumni